Theis may refer to:

People
 Daniel Theis (born 1992), German basketball player
 Phil Theis, American professional wrestler 
 Frank Gordon Theis, American federal judge
 Louis Fred Theis or Louis Fred Pfeifer, American Medal of Honor recipient
 Lucy Theis, British judge
 Mary Jane Theis, American judge
 Theis F. Rasmussen, Danish football goalkeeper

Places
 Stade Alphonse Theis, football stadium in Luxembourg

See also
 Theiss (disambiguation)
 Tice (disambiguation)
 Thies (disambiguation)

Surnames from given names